"Clash" is a song by British rapper Dave, featuring fellow British rapper Stormzy, released on 9 July 2021 by Dave and Neighbourhood Recordings as the lead single from Dave's second studio album, We're All Alone in This Together (2021). "Clash" was written by the two artists, Luke Grieve and the song's producer Kyle Evans.

Commercially, the song peaked at number two on the UK Singles Chart, becoming Dave's eighth top ten entry and Stormzy's twelfth.

Composition
"Clash" is a British hip hop track with elements of UK drill, built around a "repetitive, haunting piano" melody accompanied by "spectral, filtered synth." Lyrically, the song features "egotistic proclamations that flex their respective riches." Stormzy's verse includes subliminal lyrics targeted at British rapper Chip, which Chip responded to the same day.

Music video
The music video was released in the evening of 9 July 2021, directed by Edem Wornoo. It features Dave and Stormzy surrounded by cars at the Aston Martin factory in Warwickshire and the Silverstone Circuit.

Personnel
Credits adapted from Tidal.

 Dave – vocals
 Stormzy – vocals
 Leandro "Dro" Hidalgo – mixing
 Kyle Evans – production
 Joel Peters – engineering
 Jonny Leslie – engineering

Charts

Weekly charts

Year-end charts

Certifications

References

2021 singles
2021 songs
Dave (rapper) songs
Stormzy songs
Songs written by Dave (rapper)
Songs written by Stormzy